Gabriel Téllez ( 24 March 1583 20 February 1648), better known as Tirso de Molina, was a Spanish Baroque dramatist, poet and Roman Catholic monk. He is primarily known for writing The Trickster of Seville and the Stone Guest, the play from which the popular character of Don Juan originates. His work is also of particular significance due to the abundance of female protagonists, as well as the exploration of sexual issues.

Life and career
He was born in Madrid. He studied at Alcalá de Henares, joined the mendicant Order of the Blessed Virgin Mary of Mercy on 4 November 1600, and entered the Monastery of San Antolín at Guadalajara, Spain on 21 January 1601. He was ordained a priest by 1610.

He had been writing plays for ten years when he was sent by his superiors on a mission to the West Indies in 1615; residing in Santo Domingo from 1616 to 1618 and returning to Europe in 1618, he resided at the Mercedarian monastery in Madrid, took part in the proceedings of the Academia poetica de Madrid, founded by Sebastián Francisco de Medrano, competed in the literary tournaments then in vogue, and wrote copiously for the stage.

His first publication, the incomplete Cigarrales de Toledo (licensed in 1621, but not published till 1624), is a miscellany, containing short tales, novellas, verses and three plays. One of the novellas, Los tres maridos burlados, probably derived from Francesco Cieco da Ferrara's Mambriano, and the play entitled El vergonzoso en palacio reveal his wit and ingenuity. The preface to the Cigarrales de Toledo states that Tirso de Molina had already written three hundred plays, and at this period of his career he was second only to Lope de Vega in popularity. (Tirso de Molina was one of Lope's most ardent followers.)

He showed hostility to culteranismo in the Cigarrales de Toledo, and made numerous enemies by his attacks on the new school in such pieces as Amar por arte mayor and La celosa de si misma. The realistic character of some of his productions gave his rivals an excuse to denounce him as a corrupter of public morals to the council of Castile in 1625, and, though no legal action was taken against him, he appears to have been reprimanded privately. In 1626 it was thought advisable to transfer him to Salamanca, and Tirso de Molina left Madrid determined to write no more for the stage. Though one of his plays, La huerta de San Juan, is dated 1626, there is no proof that it was begun after his departure from Madrid, and he seems to have written nothing for eight years.

He had not lost his interest in the theatre, and published twelve representative pieces as the first part of his dramatic works (1626). This was a formal protest against the weakness of those who had been persuaded to drive him out. On the other hand, he worked zealously on behalf of his order, and rose to an important position; he became superior of the monastery at Trujillo in 1626, was elected later to the posts of reader in theology and definidor general, and in May 1632 was appointed chronicler of the Order of Mercy. His Deleitar aprovechando (1635) is a devout counterpart of the Cigarrales de Toledo, much inferior to its predecessor in interest; a sequel was promised to this collection of pious tales, pious lyrics, and autos, but, as in the case of the Cigarrales de Toledo, the continuation never appeared.

Twelve plays constitute the third part of his dramatic works which was published (before the second) in 1634, supposedly edited by the writer's nephew, "Francisco Lucas de Ávila", possibly a cover identity for himself. The second part (1635), the printing of which was paid for by the confraternity of St Jerome, contains four plays by Tirso de Molina, and eight written by him in collaboration with other dramatists; one of these collaborators was Juan Ruiz de Alarcón, but Tirso de Molina was the predominant spirit in these literary partnerships. The fourth and fifth parts of his dramatic works (1635 and 1636) each contain twelve plays; the haste with which these five volumes were issued indicates the author's desire to save some part of his work from destruction, and the appearance of his "nephew"'s name on the title-pages of the last four volumes indicates his desire to avoid conflict with the authorities. A sixth volume of dramatic pieces, consisting of light comedies, was announced; but the project was abandoned. That dramatic composition still entertained the scanty leisure of Tirso's old age is shown by the fact that the fragmentary autograph copy of Las quinas de Portugal is dated 8 March 1638, but his active career as a dramatist ended two years earlier. He was absorbed by other duties. As official chronicler of his order, he compiled the elaborate Historia de la Merced (his religious order), which occupied him till 24 December 1639 and was not published until 1973. As a tribute to the count de Sastago, who had accepted the dedication of the fourth part of the plays, and who had probably helped to defray the publishing expenses, Tirso de Molina is said to have compiled the Genealogía de la casa de Sastago (1640), but the ascription of this genealogical work is disputed. On 29 September 1645 Tirso de Molina became superior of the monastery at Soria, and died there.

It is only within the last century that it has become possible to give an outline of his life; it will always be impossible for posterity to do justice to his genius, for but a fraction of his plays have been preserved. The earliest of his extant pieces is dated 1605 and bears no sign of immaturity; in 1624 he had written three hundred plays, and in 1634 he stated that he had composed four hundred within the previous twenty years; of this immense production not more than eighty plays, are in existence. Tirso de Molina is universally known as the author of The Trickster of Seville and the Stone Guest, the piece in which Don Juan is first presented on the stage; but El Burlador de Sevilla represents only one aspect of his genius. No less remarkable than his representation of perverse depravity in El Burlador de Sevilla is his dramatic treatment of a philosophical enigma in El Condenado por desconfiado, but El Burlador de Sevilla and El Condenado por desconfiado are thought by scholars as Fernando Cantalapiedra or Alfredo Rodriguez to have been written by Andrés de Claramonte. Though manifestly attracted by exceptional cases, by every kind of moral aberration, by the infamous and the terrible, his range is virtually unlimited. He reveals himself as a master of historical interpretation in Prudence in Woman; his sympathetic, malicious wit finds dramatic expression in El vergonzoso en palacio and Don Gil of the Green Breeches, and the fine divination of feminine character in Averígüelo Vargas and La villana de Vallecas (The Peasant Woman of Vallecas) is incomparable.

Tirso de Molina has neither Lope de Vega's inventive resource, nor his infinite seduction; he has neither Pedro Calderón de la Barca's idealistic visions, nor his golden music; but he exceeds Lope in massive intellectual power and in artistic self-restraint, and he exceeds Calderón in humour, in creative faculty, and in dramatic intuition. That his reputation extended beyond the Pyrenees in his own lifetime may be gathered from the fact that James Shirley's Opportunity is derived from El Castigo del penséque; but he was neglected in Spain itself during the long period of Calderón's supremacy, and his name was almost forgotten till the end of the 18th century, when some of his pieces were timidly recast by Dionisio Solis and later by Juan Carretero.

The renaissance of his fame, however, dates from 1839–1842, when an incomplete but serviceable edition of his plays was published by Juan Eugenio Hartzenbusch. He is now accepted as among the greatest dramatists of Spain.

In 2012, Tirso's Condenado por Desconfiado was performed as Damned by Despair at the Olivier Theatre in London, in a new version by Frank McGuinness.

Bibliography
Tirso De Molina Bedrageren Fra Sevilla Og Stengæsten [El Burlador De Sevilla Y Convidado De Piedra]
Comedias escogidas
Comedias
El Teatro del Maestro Tirso de Molina
Tirso de Molina; investigaciones bio-bibliográficos
Estudios de critica literaria
Discurso ante la Real Academía española
El Condenado por desconfiado and "Mas sobre las fuentes del condenado por desconfiado"
Etudes sur l'Espagne

References

Attribution:

Spanish male dramatists and playwrights
1570s births
1648 deaths
Writers from Madrid
Order of the Blessed Virgin Mary of Mercy
People from Madrid
17th-century Spanish dramatists and playwrights
Spanish Roman Catholic priests
17th-century male writers
Baroque writers